The Letter of Forty-Two was an open letter signed by forty-two Russian literati, aimed at Russian society, the president and government, in reaction to the 1993 Russian constitutional crisis. It was published in the newspaper Izvestia on 5 October 1993 under the title "Writers demand decisive actions of the government."

Contents 

The letter contains the following seven demands:

Criticism 

Communist Pravda reacted by publishing a letter by three Soviet dissidents – Andrey Sinyavsky, Vladimir Maximov and Pyotr Abovin-Yegides – calling for Boris Yeltsin's immediate resignation. It said among other things:

Nezavisimaya Gazeta's 2nd editor-in-chief Victoria Shokhina, mentioning Vasily Aksyonov's statement ("It was right those bastards had been bombarded. Should I have been in Moscow, I'd have signed [the letter] too"), on 3 October 2004, wondered how "all of those 'democratic' writers who were preaching humanism and denouncing capital punishment" all of a sudden "came to applaud mass execution without trial". According to Shokhina, writer Anatoly Rybakov, when asked, 'would he have signed it', replied: "By no means. A writer can not endorse bloodshed". "But people like Rybakov are few and far between in our 'democratic' camp, and such people there are being disliked", Shokhina remarked.

Support

A letter entitled "An appeal of the democratic public of Moscow to the President of Russia B. N. Yeltsin" ("Обращение собрания демократической общественности Москвы к президенту России Б.Н. Ельцину") was published on 8 October 1993, echoing key demands of the Letter of Forty-Two.

Signatories 

 Ales Adamovich
 Anatoly Ananyev
 Viktor Astafiyev
 Аrtyom Anfinogenov
 Bella Akhmadulina
 Grigory Baklanov
 Zori Balayan
 Tatyana Bek
 Alexander Borshchagovsky
 Vasil Bykaŭ
 Boris Vasilyev
 Alexander Gelman
 Daniil Granin
 Yuri Davydov
 Daniil Danin
 Andrei Dementyev
 Mikhail Dudin
 Alexander Ivanov
 Edmund Iodkovsky
 Rimma Kazakova
 Sergey Kaledin
 Yury Karyakin
 Yakov Kostyukovsky
 Tatyana Kuzovlyova
 Alexander Kushner
 Yuri Levitansky
 Dmitry Likhachov
 Yuri Nagibin
 Andrey Nuykin
 Bulat Okudzhava
 Valentin Oskotsky
 Grigory Pozhenyan
 Anatoly Pristavkin
 Lev Razgon
 Alexander Rekemchuk
 Robert Rozhdestvensky
 Vladimir Savelyev
 Vasily Selyunin
 Yuri Chernichenko
 Andrey Chernov
 Marietta Chudakova
 Mikhail Chulaki

Footnotes

Open letters
1993 Russian constitutional crisis
Works originally published in Russian newspapers
1993 documents